Sławomir Jarczyk  (born 18 August 1980 in Chorzów) is a Polish footballer (defender) who plays for Polish Orange Ekstraklasa side Wisła Płock.

External links
 
 

1980 births
Living people
Polish footballers
Polonia Warsaw players
Ruch Chorzów players
Górnik Zabrze players
Wisła Płock players
Sportspeople from Chorzów
Association football defenders
Ekstraklasa players